The 2019–20 season will be Szolnoki Dózsa's 99th year in existence as a water polo club.

Competitions

Overview

Országos Bajnokság I

Hungarian Cup

Quarter-finals

Szolnoki Dózsa won, 21–19 on aggregate.

Final four
The final four was held on 7 and 8 December 2019 at the Császár-Komjádi Swimming Stadium in Budapest, II. ker.

Semi-final

LEN Champions League

Preliminary round

Matches

References

External links
 

2019 in Hungarian water polo
2020 in Hungarian water polo